Glenn Tobias Hysén (born 9 March 1982) is a Swedish former professional footballer who played as a forward or as a winger. Starting his career with Lundby IF in 1998, he went on to represent BK Häcken, Djurgårdens IF, Sunderland, IFK Göteborg, and Shanghai SIPG before retiring in 2018. A full international between 2005 and 2014, Hysén won 34 caps and scored 10 goals for the Sweden national team. He represented his country at UEFA Euro 2012.

He is the son of former professional footballer Glenn Hysén.

Early life
Hysén was born to parents Kerstin, a surgical nurse, and Liverpool and IFK Göteborg player Glenn Hysén. Hysén has a sister, Charlotte who is three years younger than him. Shortly after, his parents divorced and his father remarried. He has two half-brothers, Alexander and Anton, and one half-sister, Annie.

As a child, Hysén spent his early childhood moving around due to his father's football career. Prior to his parents' divorce, Hysén lived in Gothenburg, Sweden and Eindhoven, Netherlands.

Club career

Early career 
The first club he played for was Ubbhult IF because his cousin played there. Hysén only played for the team between 1986 and 1988. The next club he played for was Lindholmens BK because that is where he lived at the time. In 1995, Hysén played for Lundby IF where he stood for four years.

BK Häcken 
In 1999, he signed with BK Häcken where he spent a total of five seasons.

Djurgårdens IF
He joined Djurgården from BK Häcken in 2004, and signed a contract until 2008. During his time with Djurgården, he won Allsvenskan, the Swedish top division, in 2005.
He is left-footed, and started off as a left-winger but, during his time in Djurgården, he would occasionally play as a striker, and since coming back home to Sweden and IFK Göteborg he has mainly been playing as a striker, though he is mostly used as a winger when playing for the national team.

Sunderland
On 23 August 2006, Tobias signed a deal to join Sunderland, for £1.7 million. Hysén had an immediate impact on his first start for the club, against West Bromwich Albion, creating the second goal, and generally impressing. Under Roy Keane, however, Hysen was often overlooked for Ross Wallace. Despite this, Hysen scored his first goal for the club in a 1–1 draw with Leicester City, at the Stadium of Light, just minutes after being brought on as a substitute. Coincidentally, he netted the opener in the Black Cats' 2–0 win at Leicester on New Year's Day 2007.

In late July 2007, it was revealed that Tobias had requested a move back to his native Sweden. He claimed that he and his girlfriend had never really settled in Sunderland.

IFK Göteborg
On 25 August 2007, Hysén completed his move to IFK Göteborg for an undisclosed fee. Thus becoming the fifth member of his family to play for the club. In 2009, he scored 18 goals, making him the top scorer of Allsvenskan alongside Brazilian player Wánderson do Carmo.

Hysén suffered a series of minor injuries through his 2010 season which prevented him from ever reaching the top of his game, though he still managed to produce 10 goals before ending the season.
Tobias kept up a great scoring record as he ended the 2011 season scoring 16 goal in 29 games, making him the second best goalscorer of Allsvenskan 2011. He was succeeded by former teammate Mathias Ranégie who scored 21 goals.

Tobias Hysén have been considered to be one of the best active players in the Swedish football league. Many have been surprised by Hyséns dedication to stay with IFK Göteborg. In 2010, he turned down an offer from Belgian top club Club Brugge, and instead signed a new 4-year deal with Göteborg.

Shanghai SIPG
Hysén signed a two-year contract with Chinese Super League side Shanghai Dongya in the 2013–2014 winter transfer window. In his first season, he scored 19 goals and made 10 assists in 28 matches. In April 2015, he agreed to a contract extension of a further two years.

Return to IFK Göteborg and retirement 
On 26 January 2016, Hysén announced that he would return to IFK Göteborg on a 3-year contract ahead of the 2016 Allsvenskan season. At the end of the 2018 season, Hysén retired from professional football.

International career

Youth 
Hysén began his international career in 2002 when he played for Sweden's U21 where he continued to play until 2004. In November 2003, Hysén had a noticeably spectacular performance against Spain in a U-21 qualification game. Sweden landed a 3–1 victory against Spain which consequently placed them in the U21 Championships in Germany in 2004. He was part of the Sweden U21 team that finished fourth at the 2004 UEFA European Under-21 Championship.

Senior 
In January 2005, he made his international debut in a friendly against South Korea.

Hysén got a sudden call-up for Sweden's 2010 FIFA World Cup qualification game against Malta, due to the recent death of the brother of Henrik Larsson, for which Larsson got permission to leave the squad. He was later called up for a few
exhibition games with the national team, but was often overlooked for Marcus Berg and/or Alexander Gerndt when it came to more important games, mainly due to the fact that they played on a higher level in their club teams.

As of 2011, and in the UEFA Euro 2012 qualifying games, Hysén was called up regularly by the new national team coach Erik Hamrén, having played 7 games and scored 6 goals. Hysén represented Sweden at Euro 2012.

On 15 October 2013, he scored two goals in a 2014 FIFA World Cup qualifier 3–5 loss against Germany.

He made his last and 34th international appearance in a friendly against Estonia on 4 September 2014.

Personal life
Hysén is the son of the former IFK Göteborg, PSV Eindhoven, Fiorentina, and Liverpool defender Glenn Hysén. He and his longtime girlfriend Maria Kaspersson reside in Göteborg with their son Lucas, who was born on 20 January 2008. He is also a member of the Långaryd family, the largest documented family by
Guinness Book of Records. In 2009, Tobias along with his father and two brothers blogged for the Aftonbladet, primarily about football. In March 2011, Hysén's younger brother Anton came out openly as gay, and Hysén stated that he supported his brother and hoped more players would come forth. He is the great-grandson of Erik Hysén.

Career statistics

Club

International 
Appearances and goals by national team and year

International goals

Scores and results list Sweden's goal tally first.

Honours
Djurgården

 Allsvenskan: 2005
 Svenska Cupen: 2004, 2005
Sunderland
 Football League Championship: 2006–07

IFK Göteborg

 Allsvenskan: 2007
 Svenska Cupen: 2008, 2012–13
Individual
 Årets Järnkamin: 2004
 Swedish Newcomer of the Year: 2004
 Allsvenskan Player of the Season: 2009, 2013
 Allsvenskan top scorer: 2009
 Allsvenskan Forward of the Season: 2013

Notes

External links
 
 
  (archive)
  (archive)
 
 Personal Information

1982 births
Living people
Swedish footballers
Sweden youth international footballers
Sweden under-21 international footballers
Sweden international footballers
BK Häcken players
Djurgårdens IF Fotboll players
Sunderland A.F.C. players
IFK Göteborg players
Shanghai Port F.C. players
Expatriate footballers in England
Swedish expatriate footballers
Allsvenskan players
Superettan players
Ettan Fotboll players
English Football League players
UEFA Euro 2012 players
Expatriate footballers in China
Chinese Super League players
Lundby IF players
Association football forwards
Swedish expatriate sportspeople in the United Kingdom
Swedish expatriate sportspeople in China
Swedish expatriate sportspeople in England
Footballers from Gothenburg